is a national highway connecting the city of Yonezawa, Yamagata and the town of Mashiko, Tochigi in Japan.

See also

References

External links

121
Roads in Fukushima Prefecture
Roads in Tochigi Prefecture
Roads in Yamagata Prefecture